Synapse Group, Inc. is a multichannel marketing company.  Synapse is also the largest consumer magazine distributor in the United States, with access to over 700 magazine titles from all the major publishers (including Hearst Corporation, Condé Nast Publications, Meredith Corporation, and Time Inc.).  Synapse attracts subscribers for these publications by working through a number of non-traditional marketing channels, including credit card issuers, catalog companies, and airline frequent-flyer programs.

History
Synapse Group began in 1991 as NewSub Magazine Service LLC.  Founded by Jay S. Walker (who developed Priceline.com) and Michael Loeb, the company began by marketing fixed-term magazine subscriptions through credit card companies.  Over the years, NewSub expanded its marketing channels to include retailers, airlines, catalogers, and dot-com companies.  In the year 2000, the company changed its name to Synapse Group, Inc.

Continuous Service System
In 1996, NewSub introduced their Continuous Subscription Service system, which would automatically renew subscriptions.  The company applied for a patent, which was granted in 2000 to Michael Loeb and Synapse Group, Inc. for "a system for providing an open-ended subscription to commodity items normally available on a term basis includes a central agent that serves as the front-end for commodity suppliers. This central agent maintains databases containing information associated with a group of commodity items and their sales. Using these databases, the central agent produces subscription records to provide open-ended subscription services to its customers, while supporting the term-based subscriptions of the commodity suppliers."

Acquisition by Time Inc.
In 2000, Time Inc. made its first equity investment in Synapse Group, starting a partnership that would ultimately culminate with the outright purchase of Synapse in 2006.  In a 2000 press release from Time Warner, Jeremy Koch (who was Consumer Marketing President at the time) explained, "The marketing of consumer magazines is undergoing substantial change.  Our relationship with Synapse is an important part of Time Inc.'s strategy to support the expansion of new and innovative marketing methods."

Acquisition of Bizrate Insights
In 2016, Synapse Group acquired Bizrate Insights.

Acquisition of Magazine Discount Center
In 2016, Synapse Group acquired Magazine Discount Center.

Acquisition of Stop, Breathe & Think and Re-branding to MyLife
In 2019, Synapse Group acquired Stop, Breathe & Think, a mindfulness mobile app.
In May 2020, the app was re-branded as MyLife.

Operations
Synapse Group is headquartered at 225 High Ridge Road in Stamford, Connecticut.  The company employs over 250 people and has revenues of $400 million.

Divisions
 Elite Traveler Awards was founded in 1995 as CAP (Customer Appreciation Program) Systems to develop affinity marketing strategies for frequent flyer and other customer reward programs.  Members may elect to redeem their frequent flyer miles or other points for subscriptions to traditional print or electronic magazines.  Since the program was implemented, an estimated 100 billion frequent flyer miles have been redeemed for magazine subscriptions. But by early 2022, the number of magazines they offered was trimmed dramatically, to less than a dozen choices.
 Magazine Direct, a program introduced in 1998, offers magazine subscriptions to DRTV and catalog customers when they call to place orders.
 SynapseConnect, Inc. is the e-commerce subsidiary of Synapse Group.  The company has developed a number of internet-marketing strategies that attempt to use Synapse's offline marketing strength to leverage online sales.  Some of its properties include FreeBizMag.com, which launched in 2000 and was the first third-party subscription service for trade publications.
 MyLife, formerly known as Stop, Breathe & Think, is a mindfulness app that provides meditation exercises tailored to how a person responds to questions on their current emotional state. The app was created by two women, Jamie Price and Julie Campistron, who both had positive experiences with mindfulness in dealing with occupational burnout.  Much of the app content is free. The app was listed as a Top 10 Alexa Skill in 2019, and mentioned by Healthline.com as one of the best meditation apps of 2019.

Service Marks
Synapse Group has used a number of service marks over time in association with particular business channels, both for direct sales projects as well as with partner services.  These marks include:  Synapse Group Inc., Newsub Services, Synapse Solutions, Synapse Retail Ventures, and Magazine Rewards Center.  These names often appear on customers' credit card statements for the company's subscription service charges.

Deceptive Business Practices
Synapse Group has been prosecuted in court various times for its deceptive auto-renewal schemes, including a 2020 case in Washington State in which it was ordered to pay restitution to 2,000 customers and to the Washington State Office of the Attorney General. According to the news release,

"From 2011 to 2016, Synapse falsely implied on its 'Mags for Miles' mailers that Delta Air Line miles would expire if consumers didn’t use them by a specific date. In fact, Delta miles never expire... The company used this misleading claim to motivate consumers to redeem their 'expiring' miles for magazines. After consumers redeemed their miles, Synapse then offered them the separate $2 subscriptions promotion to be paid for with a credit card — which would auto-renew, often without the consumer’s knowledge, at an average of about $50 per consumer."

See also
 Time Inc.
 Meredith Corporation

References

External links
 Synapse Group Inc. - Official website
 BBB Business Review: Synapse Group, Inc.
 Bloomberg Businessweek Profile:  Synapse Group, Inc.

Marketing companies established in 1991
Direct marketing
Companies based in Stamford, Connecticut
1991 establishments in the United States
Former Time Warner subsidiaries
Meredith Corporation
IAC (company)
2006 mergers and acquisitions